Delco (formerly Brinkly, New Berlin, and Pershing) is an unincorporated community and census-designated place (CDP) in Columbus County, North Carolina, United States. The population was 348 at the 2010 census.

Geography
Combined U.S. Routes 74 and 76 (the four-lane Andrew Jackson Highway) passes through the center of the community, leading east  to Wilmington and west  to Whiteville, the Columbus County seat. North Carolina Highway 87 leads northwest from Delco  to Elizabethtown.

Acme Delco Middle School, was located in Delco prior to its closing in 2020.

Demographics

References

Unincorporated communities in North Carolina
Census-designated places in Columbus County, North Carolina
Census-designated places in North Carolina
Unincorporated communities in Columbus County, North Carolina